Ynon Kreiz (Hebrew: ינון קרייז; born 1965)  is an Israeli-American businessman and current Chairman and CEO of Mattel. He served as Chairman and CEO of Fox Kids Europe from 1997–2002, Chairman and CEO of television and digital production company Endemol from 2008 to 2011, and as Chairman, CEO and President of web video network Maker Studios, Inc. from 2012 to 2016.

Early life and education
Born and raised in Israel, Kreiz earned a BA in Economics and Management from Tel Aviv University in 1991.  He then moved to Los Angeles, California to attend graduate school and in 1993 received an M.B.A. from UCLA's Anderson School of Management.

Career

Fox Kids Europe
While at UCLA, Kreiz met American-Israeli media mogul Haim Saban whom he joined in 1994 as a business partner. In 1996 Kreiz moved to London to launch children's television network Fox Kids Europe, a joint venture with Rupert Murdoch's News Corporation. From 1997-2002 Kreiz served as Chairman and CEO of Fox Kids Europe. During his tenure, Fox Kids expanded into one of the largest pay-TV channels in Europe and the Middle East, broadcasting in 56 countries in 17 languages. In 1999 Fox Kids Europe (FKE) was listed on the Euronext Stock Exchange in Amsterdam, and in 2001 the Walt Disney Company acquired a majority stake (76%) in Fox Kids Europe, with the remaining 24% of its stock publicly traded. Kreiz resigned from FKE at the expiration of his contract in 2002, the year following the Disney sale.

Benchmark Capital Europe (Balderton Capital)
In 2005-2007 Kreiz was a General Partner at European VC firm Benchmark Capital (later renamed Balderton Capital). Kreiz served on the boards of several media/technology companies including North American Sport Network (sold to ESPN in 2006), Next New Networks (sold to Google in 2011), Setanta Sports, Wonga and Codemasters.

Endemol
From 2008 to 2011 Kreiz served as Chairman and CEO of Netherlands-based global television and digital production company Endemol, known for unscripted reality programming hits such as 'Big Brother' and others.  During Kreiz's tenure, Endemol "strengthened its creative output, diversified its lines of business, completed highly accretive M&A transactions, expanded geographically, reduced its cost structure and entered into new strategic relationships." Challenges were numerous, however. While operational performance remained strong under Kreiz, the company had substantial debt with a high level of interest payments from its 2007 buyout at the peak of the private-equity boom prior to Kreiz joining the company.  In addition, changes in consumer media consumption required diversifying risk; Kreiz is credited with restructuring Endemol's creative profile and business operations through expansion from reality television into scripted programming and distribution.

Maker Studios
In 2012, Kreiz invested in and joined the board of Los Angeles based multi-channel network Maker Studios as Chairman and in 2013 became CEO.  Maker Studios produces short-form videos on YouTube and other platforms, with a roster of over 55,000 independent artists.  In March 2014, Kreiz negotiated the sale of Maker to Disney for $500 million, with an additional $450 million based on meeting performance incentives.  During Kreiz's tenure, Maker's network and reach expanded beyond YouTube, including deals with Dish Network, Vimeo, as well as the creation mobile apps and branded video hubs for its individual content creators.  In January 2016 Kreiz stepped down as CEO following the expiration of Maker's earn-out agreement with Disney.

Mattel
In April 2018, Kreiz became CEO of Mattel, replacing Margo Georgiadis, after a year of continued weak sales. Kreiz became board chairman in May 2018. In 2021, under Kreiz's leadership, Mattel's net sales were up 19% and its operating income was up 95% vs. the prior year - Mattel's highest annual growth rate in the last decade.

As CEO, Kreiz and Mattel set ESG goals of achieving 100% recyclable plastic materials in all products and packaging, reducing plastic packaging by 25% per product by 2030, and maintaining 100% pay equity globally.

Personal life
Kreiz is a former windsurfing instructor and avid kite surfer. He is married to Israeli Olympian Anat Fabrikant with four children.  Kreiz was the Attaché of the Israeli Olympic team for the 2012 Summer Olympics and Chairman of the Boards of Trustees in support of the Israeli athletes.  He is a member of the Board of Advisors at UCLA's Anderson School of Management and the Board of Directors at Warner Music Group.

Kreiz is also a member of Business Roundtable, an organization of CEOs of America's leading companies.

In popular culture
In the 2023 film Barbie, Kreiz will be portrayed by Will Ferrell.

References

External links
Maker Studios
Endemol
Fox Kids Europe

21st-century American businesspeople
American businesspeople in the online media industry
American chief executives in the media industry
American financiers
American investors
American Jews
American mass media company founders
American television producers
Israeli chief executives
Israeli emigrants to the United States
Israeli financiers
Israeli investors
Israeli Jews
Israeli television producers
Living people
Year of birth missing (living people)